Dowr or Dur may refer to:
 Dowr, Isfahan
 Dowr, Chabahar, Sistan and Baluchestan Province
 Dowr, Konarak, Sistan and Baluchestan Province